Although leprosy, or Hansen's Disease, was never an epidemic in The United States, cases of leprosy have been reported in Louisiana as early as the 18th century. The first leprosarium in the continental United States existed in Carville, Louisiana from 1894-1999 and Baton Rouge, Louisiana is the home of the only institution in the United States that is exclusively devoted to leprosy consulting, research, and training.

History

18th Century
The route of Leprosy into Louisiana has not been resolved. However, during the 18th century, while the Spanish controlled Louisiana, Spanish physicians and surgeons noted that many of the Africans brought to Louisiana during the slave trade were afflicted with Leprosy.
According to City Counsel records, in 1776, the Spanish governor of Louisiana, Antonio de Ulloa, tried to banish all lepers to the outskirt of the colony. Three years later, after much objection from citizens of the colony and a devastating hurricane, this project was abandoned.
In 1785, under the rule of a new governor, Don Estevan Miro, the issue of what should be done about leprosy was raised again. The solution was to erect Louisiana's first leprosarium. According to the minutes of an April 1784 City Council meeting, it was announced that the governor built a hospital, "so that the lepers may be kept together." This leprosarium was known as "La Terre des Lepreux," or Leper's Land. In 1799, the leprosarium was the home of five lepers. Due to complaints, allegations of unsanitary conditions at the leprosarium, and allegations and findings that none of the five inmates had leprosy, the leprosarium was closed in 1806.

19th Century
After the Louisiana Purchase, the state had very few written records concerning leprosy until the mid-1800s.
On the 1850 U.S. Census, leprosy was listed as a cause of death. Four deaths were recorded from Louisiana.
Beginning in 1857, Annual reports from Charity Hospital (New Orleans), indicated that the hospital freely admitted those with leprosy. The large number of cases at Charity Hospital remained unreported to the general public until 1888. Releasing this data made some New Orleans residents more conscious of leprosy that they had previously been. This data, known as the Blanc Data, which is named after the doctor that released this information, informed New Orleans citizens and public health officials that, contrary to popular belief, leprosy was an endemic in New Orleans, especially among white citizens.
In the 1880s, the incidence rate of leprosy in Louisiana was 4.5 per 100,000 people.
By the 1890s, most accepted that leprosy existed in Louisiana, that no one knew how the disease was transmitted, and that there was no cure.  When a story in the Daily Picayune alerted residents that a physician, under state contract, was caring for leprosy patients in a "pest-house" near Bayou St. John in New Orleans, a clamor went up for new laws to be passed.
The Louisiana Leper Home, an institution to quarantine lepers living in Louisiana, was opened in 1894 in Carville, Louisiana. The first seven patients of the leprosarium were from New Orleans and arrived at the leprosarium on December 1, 1894. This was the humble beginnings of the first in-patient hospital in the U.S. for the treatment of leprosy. Due to several name changes over the years, the treatment center was frequently referred to as "Carville" because of its location. The goal of this treatment center was to provide a place for patients to be isolated and treated humanely.
By 1896, there were 31 patients at the leprosarium. Four Catholic sisters from the Daughters of Charity of St. Vincent de Paul came to care for these patients.

20th century
In 1921, the U.S. Public Health Service took over the facility and funded a budget toward leprosy research.
By the late 1920s, Louisiana's incidence rate of leprosy reached an all-time high of 12 per 100,000. However, leprosy never became an epidemic in Louisiana and at the most residents Carville ever had was about 400 people.
By the early 1990s, the leprosarium had a budget of $21 million in U.S. per year. However, with fewer patients in the hospital and medical advances for the treatment of leprosy, the leprosarium lost funding and subsequently shut down in 1999.
Out-patient care in several clinics around the United States supply primary treatment and medication to the 200 or so new cases diagnosed yearly in the US.

21st Century
As of 2001, there were fifteen total leprosy, or Hansen's Disease, cases reported in Louisiana. Thirteen of those reported cases were endemic. These thirteen endemic cases came from thirteen different parishes in Louisiana. However, most of these cases were concentrated in the southern half of the state.

Life at Carville
From 1894-1999, the leprosarium underwent several name changes: Louisiana Leper Home (1894), U.S. Marine Hospital No. 66 (1921), Gillis W. Long Hansen's (Leprosy) Disease Center (1986). Due to the various names, the leprosarium was commonly referred to as "Carville." Carville became known as the national leprosarium because all persons diagnosed with leprosy (Hansen's disease) in the U.S. were required, by law, to be quarantined and treated. The leprosarium soon became a center for leprosy research.

Identity
Due to the social stigmas that surrounded leprosy in Louisiana, upon arriving at Carville, patients were encouraged to take on a new identity. As a result, many patients at Carville changed their names. Additionally, some patients had very limited contact with family members. Visitors were allowed, but the remote location made this difficult. Even the staff of the leprosarium seldom knew the patients' real names or knew what town they came from.

Literature
Numerous patients have written books, journals, and have done interviews about their times at Carville.
Carville patients had an official publication called "The Star." Issues dating from 1941 to 1999 can be found online at the Louisiana Digital Library.

Film
"Secret People" is a documentary that details personal accounts of men and women who were residents at Carville during the 20th century. It can be viewed online in its entirety.
"The Triumph at Carville" premiered on PBS in March 2008. This film retells the history of Carville and provides insight into the lives of people affected by leprosy, including patients, family members of patients, and staff members.

Leaving the leprosarium
Patients at Carville were often granted short leaves from the institution. However, they were not allowed to use public transportation and they had to return to Carville once their official leave period was over.
Escapes and attempted escapes from Carville were reported. Most of the attempts and escapes were made by men. If apprehended, one type of punishment was a sentence in the Carville jail. A first time escape was usually punished with "30 days in jail". Most people escaped through holes in the barbed wire fence.

Death
When a resident of Carville died, he or she could be buried in the leprosarium's cemetery, if the family couldn't afford to bring the body home or the patient preferred to be buried at the hospital. Each patient received a tombstone that contained his or her name—either their real name or pseudonym—and case number.

Personalities
Many physicians in Louisiana have devoted their lives to researching leprosy. Additionally, numerous patients of Carville have worked to bring attention to the disease.
In the 1940s, Dr. Guy Henry Faget, a physician at Carville, developed sulfone therapy to treat leprosy.
During the 1950s, Dr. R. G. Cochrone, a consulting physician at Carville, developed the use of dapsone pills to treat leprosy.
Edwina Parra, using the pseudonym Betty Martin while she was a resident of Carville, published an autobiography in 1950 entitled "Miracle at Carville." Her autobiography was on The New York Times Bestseller List.  In 1959, also under the name Betty Martin, she published a follow-up titled "No One Must Ever Know".
Stanley Stein, a resident of Carville published his autobiography in 1963. The book was titled "Alone No Longer"; his real name was Sidney Maurice Levyson and he died in the mid 1960s.  He was the founder and, for many years, the editor of "The Star".
In the 1960s, Dr. Paul W. Brand began the first leprosy rehabilitation research program.

Policy
On February 3, 1917, the United States Senate passed US Public Law 64-299, An Act to Provide for the Care and Treatment of Persons Afflicted with Leprosy and to Prevent the Spread of Leprosy in the United States.
In 1920, the "Home" is sold by the State of Louisiana to the United States Federal Government for $35,000.
1921, The United States Public Health Service (USPHS) takes operational control and the 'Home' becomes the United States Marine Hospital Number 66. . . The National Leprosarium of the United States.
In 1982, The Health Resources and Services Administration: U.S. Department of Health and Human Services, assumed responsibility for the management and operation of the leprosarium at Carville.
In 1998, The U.S. Congress passed a bill to relocate the leprosarium to Baton Rouge, Louisiana.

Medical advances
The 1941 development of sulfone therapy, a type of chemotherapy, made leprosy non-contagious.
Dapsone pills became widely used for treating leprosy in the 1950s.
In 1981, The World Health Organization recommended using a multi-drug treatment regimen to treat leprosy.
In 2011, researchers at the National Hansen's Disease Program published their findings that leprosy in Louisiana and in other southern states may be linked to contact with armadillos. They came to this conclusion after finding that armadillos had the same strain of leprosy as some human patients in Louisiana did.
Currently, researchers are trying to develop a leprosy vaccine and are trying to find new methods of detection.

References

Further reading
Armadillos linked to Louisiana leprosy. (2011, April 29). Retrieved from The Independent website:https://www.independent.co.uk/life-style/health-and-families/health-news/armadillos-linked-to-louisiana-leprosy-2276286.html
Boulard, G. (1993, November 29). Carville La Leper Colony. Los Angeles Times. Retrieved from http://articles.latimes.com/1993-11-29/news/mn-62114_1_leper-colony
Gaudet, M. (2004). Carville: Remembering Leprosy in America. Jackson: University Press of Mississippi.
Gussow, Z. (1989). Leprosy, Racism, and Public Health: Social Policy in Chronic Disease Control. Boulder: Westview Press.
Henderson, L. (2006). Louisiana Leper Home Records. Retrieved October 30, 2011, from Louisiana and Lower Mississippi Valley Collections Special Collections, Hill Memorial Library Louisiana State University Libraries Baton Rouge, Louisiana State University website: http://www.lib.lsu.edu/special/findaid/2515.htm#summary
The History of Leprosy. (n.d.). Retrieved December 27, 2011, from http://www.stanford.edu/group/parasites/ParaSites2005/Leprosy/history.htm
History of the Disease. (2011, February 8). Leprosy (Hansen's Disease). Retrieved December 21, 2011, from Department of Health and Human Services:National Institute of Allergiesand Infectious Diseases website: http://www.dhh.state.la.us/offices/miscdocs/docs-249/annual/LaIDAnnual_Leprosy.pdf
History of the National Hansen's Disease (Leprosy) Program. (n.d.). Hansen's Disease. Retrieved December 27, 2011, from U.S. Department of Health and Human Services Health, Resources and Services Administration website: http://www.hrsa.gov/hansensdisease/history.html
Hughes, A. E., Bertonneau, D., & Enna, C. D. (1968, November). Nurses at Carville . The American Journal of Nursing, 68(12), 2564-2560. Retrieved from https://www.jstor.org/stable/3453720
Martin, B. (1954). Miracle at Carville (E. Wells, Ed.). Garden City: Doubleday & Company, Inc.
McCoy, G. W. (1948, November 19). Leprosy: Factors in Public Health Management. Public Health Reports, 63(47), 1522-1526. Retrieved from https://www.jstor.org/stable/4586765
Pearson, M. (1991, December). Leprosy, Racism, and Public Health:Social Policy and Chronic Disease Control. Medical Anthropology Quarterly, 5(4), 404-406. Retrieved from https://www.jstor.org/
stable/649295
Pfeifer, L. A. (2002, August 27). Endemic Hansen's Disease in Louisiana - h2001. Retrieved October 30, 2011, from National Hansen's Disease Programs website:http://www.hrsa.gov/hansensdisease/pdfs/hansens2001louisiana.pdf
 Skinsnes, A. V. S. V., & Binford, C. H. (1980). Leprosy Research and the Public Health Service: A Brief Chronological Résumé. Public Health Reports, 95(5), 210-212. Retrieved from https://www.jstor.org/stable/4596283
Triumph at Carville. (n.d.) Retrieved from PBKS website: https://www.pbs.org/triumphatcarville/
 New Orleans Leper Hospital Collection and other related items at The Historic New Orleans Collection

Louisiana
Health in Louisiana